Anne Davies is a former Washington correspondent for Australian newspapers The Age and The Sydney Morning Herald.

Biography 
She is an alumna of SCEGGS Darlinghurst, an inner-city school for girls in Sydney, Australia.

Career 
Davies has previously been the state political editor and urban affairs editor for The Sydney Morning Herald and also spent 10 years covering U.S. federal politics. She currently writes an opinion column, "National Times," for The Sydney Morning Herald.

In 2002, she won a Gold Walkley, an investigative journalism award, with Kate McClymont for coverage of a rugby league salary cap scandal associated with the Canterbury Bulldogs. She is a member of the Media, Entertainment and Arts Alliance union in Australia.

She was a panelist in May 2010 at the Sydney Writers Festival.

Together with Helen Trinca, Davies co-authored the book Waterfront: The Battle That Changed Australia, (Doubleday/Transworld, 2000) about the 1998 stand-off between Patrick Stevedores and the Maritime Union of Australia.

In 2014, Davies wrote an article which incorrectly identified Melinda Pedavoli as a teacher who had resigned following allegations of sexual misconduct. Davies' conduct was found to be 'improper, unjustifiable or lacking in bona fides'.

References

External links 
Anne Davies Profile in The Age
 

Year of birth missing (living people)
Living people
Australian women journalists
Australian journalists
People educated at Sydney Church of England Girls Grammar School
The Sydney Morning Herald people